Vanapuram is a panchayat town in Tiruvanamalai district, Tamil Nadu India. It is in Thandarampattu taluk. It has a population of 6,112. It is 3rd largest town in Thandarampattu taluk. It is in the altitude of 98m. It is in the border of the Thiruvannamalai district in Trichy & Kallakuruchi route. It is known for its name "vanapuram" means "vanathin puram" the land of heaven. The landmark of the village is PWB OFFICE

Cities and towns in Tiruvannamalai district